A Midnight Session with the Jazz Messengers is a live album by Art Blakey & the Jazz Messengers originally released on the Elektra label in 1957. The album masters were sold to Savoy and re-released as Art Blakey and the Jazz Messengers in 1960 and Mirage in 1977.

Reception

The AllMusic review by Scott Yanow stated, "Already at this early stage, the band was the epitome of hard bop and just beginning to become an influential force. ... the music is consistently excellent and typically hard swinging".

Track listing
 "Casino" (Gigi Gryce)  – 5:00
 "The Biddie Griddies" (Ray Draper)  – 5:56
 "Potpourri" (Mal Waldron)  – 4:21
 "Ugh!" (Draper)  – 5:33
 "Mirage" (Waldron)  – 4:39
 "Reflections of Buhaina" (Draper)  – 6:47 Originally issued on Mono LP
 "Study in Rhythm" (Art Blakey)   – 4:12  Originally issued on Stereo LP
 "Reflections on Buhaina (alternate take)" (Draper)  – 4:42 Bonus track on CD re-issue

Personnel
 Art Blakey  – drums
 Bill Hardman  – trumpet
 Jackie McLean  – alto saxophone
 Sam Dockery  – piano
 Spanky DeBrest  – bass

References 

Art Blakey live albums
The Jazz Messengers live albums
1957 live albums
Albums produced by Jac Holzman
Savoy Records live albums
Elektra Records live albums